Hans Ertl (21 February 1908 in Munich, Germany – 23 October 2000 in Chiquitania, Bolivia) was a German mountaineer and Nazi propagandist. He is most known for being the father of Monika Ertl, the Communist guerrilla who assassinated Roberto Quintanilla Pereira, the man responsible for chopping off Che Guevara's hands.

Film career
In 1939, while preparing to leave to shoot a film in Chile, Hans Ertl was conscripted by the Third Reich to be a "war correspondent." As a cameraman in Nazi Germany, he worked with director Leni Riefenstahl on several of her Nazi propaganda films, including Olympia. During World War II, he was among the preferred cameramen accompanying General Rommel, which earned him a reputation as "Rommel's photographer". During the early part of his career, he invented an underwater camera and a ski-mountable camera, both of which transformed the way films were shot.

In the mid-1950s, after an arrest by the Allies and being banned from working professionally in Germany, Ertl fled to Chile and finally resettled in Bolivia, where he made two feature-length "expedition film"-like documentaries. He embarked on a third but ceased after his tractor crashed through a wooden bridge with two-thirds of the uninsured exposed footage on board. Frustrated, he then decided to become a farmer and retired to La Dolorida, a piece of semi-jungle land in eastern Bolivia, where he was known as "Juan."

Personal life
Ertl's first wife and mother of his three daughters died from liver cancer in 1958.  His favorite daughter was Monika Ertl, with whom Ertl became upset when she decided to join the leftist ELN guerrilla movement in 1969. He refused to allow her to convert part of the farm into a military training ground. When Monika was gunned down by the Bolivian military in retribution for having allegedly helped in the 1971 assassination of Colonel Roberto Quintanilla Pereira, the Bolivian consul in Hamburg, her father was "relieved that she had gone in peace."

He was also an acquaintance of Klaus Barbie and, earlier, supposedly a lover of Riefenstahl. He rarely returned to Germany, where he felt cheated out of an important film award, but days before his death he reportedly asked his daughter Heidi, who lived in Bavaria, to send him a bag of German soil. Ertl died in 2000 and was buried on his farm, which is now a museum.
In a 2008 Time article, Ertl's daughter Beatriz denied that her father was a Nazi, saying that he served out of "obligation" and that he "did what he could to survive." His daughter also stated that Riefenstahl was "the love of his life."

Famous ascents
 1930: First ascent of the Königspitze north face
 1931: First ascent of the Ortler north face
 1934: First ascent of Sia Kangri
 1942: Mount Elbrus 
 1950: First solo-climb of Illimani South, first ascent of Illimani North
 1951: Second ascent of Illampu
 1953: Camp 5 (6900 m) on Nanga Parbat on the 1953 German–Austrian Nanga Parbat expedition, where he took the famous pictures of Hermann Buhl returning from his solo first ascent

Works
 1932: Assistant at Arnold Fanck's S.O.S. Eisberg
 1934: Assistant at Arnold Fanck's The Eternal Dream
 1935: Demon of the Himalayas
 1936: Director of photography for Leni Riefenstahl's Olympia - Teil 1: Fest der Völker, Teil 2: Fest der Schönheit
 1938: Cameraman for Luis Trenker's Liebesgrüße aus dem Engadin
 1939: Cameraman for Arnold Fanck's A German Robinson Crusoe
 1939: Assistant for BDM-Werk Glaube und Schönheit mit dem Film Glaube und Schönheit
 1953: Director and cameraman of the documentary Nanga Parbat 1953

In popular culture 
Rodrigo Hasbún's second novel, Affections, is loosely based on Ertl's life.

References

External links 
 
 
 
 Short biography at the Herrligkoffer institute (in German)
Times article

1908 births
2000 deaths
Film people from Munich
German cinematographers
German mountain climbers
Photographers from Munich
German emigrants to Bolivia